RRD Editor is a GUI-based application that provides access to archived RRDtool data.

Features
The visual editing features of the RRD Editor allow users to modify the contents of an RRD (Round-Robin Database).  Once an RRD is loaded into the editor, users can quickly locate a specific data point to modify or remove an entire Round-Robin Archive (RRA).  The tool also allows new data sources and RRAs to be added in addition to detecting and removing spikes.

RRD Editor is licensed under the GNU GPL.

See also
 RRD World - RRDtool Companions

Notes

External links
 RRD Editor@sourceforge

Network management
Internet Protocol based network software